Sara Khoshshans, also known mononymously as Saaren, is an Iranian singer.

Early life 
Sara Khoshshans, with the name Saren, was born on October 23, 2000, in Tehran. She plays the guitar and piano.

Singing and acting career 
At the age of 13, she planned a professional career. At the age of 16, Saren joins a group called 13, but it did not have much success for him, and after that, She collaborated with a person named Benart and achieved many successes. She first music was in collaboration with Benarat, who together created the song "Ki Arzoo Kord" and even though this was Saren's first song, it attracted many people. It was close to playing the song when Saren decided to perform this song alone, he did so and by performing alone he attracted many positive comments.

Discography

Singles

See also 

 Persian pop music
 Persian women musicians
 Music of Iran
 Persian women musicians

References

External links 

 
 
 
 

Living people
2000 births
People from Tehran
Singers from Tehran
20th-century singers
Iranian folk singers
Iranian women singers
Persian-language singers
Iranian classical singers
Iranian women pop singers
Iranian singer-songwriters